Leech Creek is a stream in Columbia and Sauk counties, in the U.S. state of Wisconsin.

Leech Creek was named on account of the water "leaching" through the soil.

See also
List of rivers of Wisconsin

References

Rivers of Columbia County, Wisconsin
Rivers of Sauk County, Wisconsin
Rivers of Wisconsin